Summer White (Blanco de verano) is a 2020 Mexican drama in Spanish that premiered at the Sundance Film Festival. 

It is rated  on Rotten Tomatoes. It was slated for wide release in France on June 23, 2021. It is a coming of age film about Valeria and her 13-year old son Rodrigo. Some critics praise the new director while others think it is unable to create a compelling character study.

It runs for 87 minutes.

References 

2020 films
Mexican drama films
2020 drama films